Airscape is a Belgian trance act composed of Johan Gielen and formerly, Sven Maes. The group also recorded as Svenson & Gielen and several other pseudonyms. The two man group dissolved in 2005, each going solo. In 2009, Airscape was revived by Johan Gielen.

Biography
The name Airscape was first used by Johan Gielen for work with other producers, mostly Jos Borremans. Gielen and Sven Maes started producing together in 1994 under the alias Body Heat. It wouldn't be until 1997 that they would resurrect the Airscape name, and until 2000 that they would become known as Svenson & Gielen.

They are known for their songs like "L'Esperanza" (1999) and "The Beauty of Silence" (2000), but are also known for their remixes of singles such as Tiësto's "Sparkles", Vengaboys' "Kiss (When the Sun Don't Shine)", Chicane's "Halcyon" and Delerium's "Silence", the latter of which was used as the lead single release and in the music video of the song when it was re-issued in 2000, reaching the top 3 of the UK Singles Chart. Their remixes have a distinctive and easily recognized style; they fade in and out looped vocals, overlay simple chord patterns on a fuzzy-sounding synthesizer, and almost always cut the bass and drums about halfway through the song to bring an ostinato to the foreground before returning to the main theme. Similar elements can be found to a lesser degree in their original music as well.

In 2005, the Airscape project took a firm break when Sven Maes left the project, but in 2009 Johan Gielen resurrected Airscape as a solo project and injected it with a new release, "My Love" featuring Jes.

Discography

Airscape
1993 Cruising
1993 Jafar Wizard
1994 Party Supply
1994 The Seventh Key
1995 Plaisir D'Eté
1997 "Pacific Melody", with Peter Ramson - UK #27
1998 "Amazon Chant", with Peter Ramson - UK #46
1999 "L'Esperanza" - UK #33
2004 "Sosei"
2009 "My Love", with JES
2009 "L'Esperanza 2009"
2010 Now & Then
2010 "My Love", with JES
2013 "Endless Forever"
2013 "Welcome Home"
2013 "Promise", with Radboud
2014 "All Of Us", with Peetu S
2014 "Manami's Theme" E
2015 "Beautiful Tomorrow"
2015 "Pianomatic", with Peetu S

Svenson & Gielen
2000 "The Beauty of Silence", with Christel Ferket
2001 "Twisted", with Paul Mendez
2002 "Answer the Question"
2002 "We Know What You Did..."
2003 "Beachbreeze (Remember the Summer)", with Jan Johnston

DJ Don & Svenson
1997 "My Beat Shoot Back"
1997 "Back Once Again"
1998 "My Beat Shoot Back '98"
1999 "Acceleration"
2002 "My Beat Shoot Back 2002"

Body Heat/T-Phobia
1994 "Waves of Life"
1996 "Gonna Make U Feel"
1997 "T-Fobia", with Petra Spiegl and Peter Ramson (¹)
2001 "The Future of House 2001"
 (¹) This track was also released with the artist and track names reversed

Bocaccio Life
1997 "The Secret Wish"
1998 "Time (There's No Way)"
1998 "Angels", with Petra Spiegl

Other aliases
1998 "Guilty?", as Leader of the Nation
1998 "The Night Jam", as Buzzerr"
1998 "Open Your Heart", as Ramses, with Carl Johansen and Ivo Donckers
1999 "Moments in Love", as Allegro1999 "Mystic Paradise", as Nightwatchers1999 "Planet Rio", as Summer Madness, with DJ Jean
1999 "Summer Power", as Summer Madness, with DJ Jean
1999 "In Love with an Angel", as Sweet Deception1999 "Fresh (All Night Long)", as Straweberry Flavour1999 "Destination Sunshine", as Balearic Bill, with Alex Gold
2000 "The Beginning", as Bombario, with Rutger Steenbergen
2000 "Living on my Own", as Mr. Vinx, with DJ Serge and Remy Martinez
2001 "Lost in a Dream", as Matanka, with Michael Parsberg

Production for other artists
1997 Shaydie - "Always Forever"
1998 Lava Rouge - "Do You Want Me"
1998 Da Phat Smokers - "The Light"
1999 Des Mitchell - "(Welcome) To The Dance"
2000 Alice Deejay - "The Lonely One"
2002 Ayumi Hamasaki - "Depend on You" (Svenson & Gielen remix)
2004 Cyber X feat. Jody Watley - "Waves of Love"

Remixes
As Airscape
1997 Zohra - "I Hate 2 Love You"
1998 Jesus Loves You - "Generations of Love"
1999 Absolom - "Where?"
1999 Tiësto - "Sparkles"
1999 Praga Khan - "Breakfast In Vegas"
1999 Sweet Deception - "In Love With An Angel"
1999 Delerium feat. Sarah McLachlan - "Silence"
1999 Singles & Angles - "Submerge"
1999 Des Mitchell - "Welcome To The Dance"
1999 Vengaboys - Kiss (When The Sun Don't Shine)
2000 Manya - "Bound"
2000 Beam & Yanou - "Sound Of Love" (Airscape vs. Des Mitchell)
2000 Chicane - "Halcyon"
2000 Sagitaire - "Shout (C'Mon)"
2000 Kosmonova- "Danse Avec Moi!"
2000 Bombario - “The Beginning”
2000 RMB - "Deep Down Below"
2000 Tomski - "Love Will Come"
2000 Scooter - "I'm Your Pusher"
2000 Alice Deejay - "The Lonely One"
2000 Mythos 'N DJ Cosmo - Hymn
2000 Gotham - "Elephant Fish"
2000 Delerium - "Silence"
2000 Sylver - "Turn The Tide"
2001 Safri Duo - "Played-A-Live"
2001 Mr. Vinx - "Livin' On My Own"
2001 Wendy Phillips - "Stay"
2001 Vanessa-Mae - "White Bird"
2001 Tekara - "Breathe In You"

As Svenson & Gielen
1997 Cubic 22 - "Party People"
2000 Factor 9 - "Release Me"
2000 Push - "The Legacy"
2001 Ayumi Hamasaki - "Depend On You"
2001 Moogue - "China Girl"
2001 Ultra - "Free"
2001 Tiesto - "Lethal Industry"
2002 Brooklyn Bounce - "Bring It Back"
2002 Minimalistix - "Close Cover"
2002 Blank & Jones - "Watching The Waves"
2002 ATB - "Hold You"
2002 The Thrillseekers - "Dreaming of You"
2002 Every Little Thing - "Dear Friend"
2002 Don Diablo - "Acceleration"
2002 Lexicon 4 - "Reach Me"
2002 Divine Inspiration - "The Way"
2003 Delerium feat. Jael - "After All"
2003 Divine Inspiration - "The Way (Put Your Hand On Me)
2003 Spacediver - "Unspoken"
2004 Cyber X - "Waves of Love"

As DJ Don & Svenson
1997 Laguna - "Spiller From Rio"
1998 MaUVe - "93"
1998 Boccaccio Life - "Angels"
1998 Babe Instinct - "Disco Babes From Outer Space"
1998 Leader Of The Nation - "Guilty?"
1998 Praga Khan - "Injected With A Poison"
1998 Ramses II - "Open Your Heart"
1998 Mad Diva - "Spotlight"
1998 Da Phat Smokers - "The Light"
1999 The Footclub - "Driftwood "
1999 Dixie's Gang - "Party Time"
1999 La Luna - "Venus"

Other Aliases
1997 Shaydie - "Always Forever" (as Body Heat)
2009 Airscape - "L'Esperanza 2009" (as S&G''')

References

External links
 Svenson's site
 Gielen's site
 
 
 Endless Forever Review by TranceFixxed

Belgian trance musicians
Belgian electronic musicians
Remixers
Musical groups disestablished in 2004